Gone Fishin' is a song written by Nick and Charles Kenny

Background
The song had been published in 1950 and was recorded by Arthur Godfrey, The Three Suns with Texas Jim Robertson, and by the Johnny Guarnieri Quintet  in 1950. None of these recordings charted.

Bing Crosby and Louis Armstrong recording
In 1951, "Gone Fishin'" was recorded by Bing Crosby and Louis Armstrong. The Crosby recording came about when the singer had Armstrong as a guest on his radio show which was being taped on April 19, 1951 for broadcast on April 25 that year. As was customary, the songs to be used in the broadcast were taped in advance as a back-up in case the live broadcast versions did not go well. The song was so well received that Decca Records decided to issue the pre-recording commercially and it charted briefly in June 1951 with a peak position of #19. Crosby used the song in his concert performances in 1976 singing it with comedian Ted Rogers. The duet with Louis Armstrong is still heard frequently on radio.

Later recordings
The song was later recorded by:
Pat Boone recorded it for his Yes Indeed! LP (1958)
Gene Autry
The Manhattan Transfer.

References

Louis Armstrong songs
Bing Crosby songs
1951 songs
Songs with lyrics by Charles Kenny
Songs with lyrics by Nick Kenny (poet)